Coffee, Kill Boss is a 2013 film starring Eddie Jemison, Noureen DeWulf and Robert Forster, and co-starring Richard Riehle, Zibby Allen, Chris Wylde, Jack Wallace, Denise Grayson and W. Cameron Tucker. Directed by Nathan Marshall and written by Sigurd Ueland, Coffee, Kill Boss premiered on opening night of the 2013 Austin Film Festival. In 2010, the screenplay for Coffee, Kill Boss (then titled 10 Habits of Highly Effective People) was a finalist in the Austin Film Festival Screenwriting Competition. Set on the 20th floor of a monolithic corporate tower, Coffee, Kill Boss follows ten executives who secretly meet to sell off their company, but instead become victims of an outrageous murder scheme.

Coffee, Kill Boss was distributed by Devolver Digital and Cinedigm. It was one of the first feature films made available on Steam, and is also available digitally on Amazon Prime, Hulu, iTunes, Google Play and Netflix.

Festivals
 2013 Austin Film Festival
 2013 Eugene International Film Festival [WINNER: GRAND JURY AWARD, BEST COMEDY FEATURE]
 2014 Maryland International Film Festival [WINNER: GRAND JURY AWARD, BEST FEATURE]
 2014 SOHO International Film Festival [WINNER: GRAND JURY AWARD, BEST DIRECTOR-Nathan Marshall]
 2014 Comedy Ninja Film and Screenplay Festival [WINNER: BEST FEATURE FILM, BEST DIRECTOR-Nathan Marshall, BEST ACTOR-Eddie Jemison, BEST ACTRESS-Noureen DeWulf and Zibby Allen]
 2014 Waterfront Film Festival
 2014 Tyrolean International Film Festival
 2014 Moondance International Film Festival
 2014 Gwinnett Center International Film Festival [WINNER: BEST FEATURE FILM, BEST DIRECTOR-Nathan Marshall, BEST ACTOR-Eddie Jemison, BEST ACTRESS-Noureen DeWulf]
 2014 Landlocked Film Festival
 2014 Naperville Independent Film Festival

Reviews
 Richard Propes, The Independent Critic
 Bears Fonte, AMFM Magazine
 EJ Feddes, SpunkyBean.com
 Lisa Mejia, Austin Fusion Magazine
 
 Eric Brian Stevens www.vox.com/mx (Spanish)

References

External links
 
 

2013 films